Red Room was the first concert tour headlined by South Korean girl group Red Velvet, in support of their first special extended play The Red Summer (2017). The tour is the group's very first concert in three years since their debut.

Background 
On July 4, 2017, through a press release, SM Entertainment revealed that Red Velvet would be holding their first ever solo concert titled "Red Room" for two nights on August 19 and 20. Tickets for the two shows sold-out in seconds which caused the website to crash. Due to high demand, one additional show was added and to be held on August 18.

In Japan, the first show of Red Velvet's Japanese hall tour was held on May 25, 2018, at Marine Messe Fukuoka, in Fukuoka, Japan. SM Entertainment has decided to hold a hall tour on six cities in Japan in response to the flood of applications referring to the group performing in the country. This is the first nationwide hall tour with eight performances at six locations in Japan, starting in the Wakuwaku Holiday Hall in Sapporo, Hokkaido on May 25, ahead of the release of Red Velvet's first Japanese mini album #Cookie Jar on July 4.

Critical reception 
The Red Room received generally favorable reviews from critics. Kim Soo-jung from No Cut News praised the clear concepts, good songs, and vibrancy of the concert for its "peculiar bizarreness and exciting and lively interaction with fans". Yoo Byung-chul from the Korea Economic Daily described the concert as "splendidly staged" further praising the concepts for being able to "maximize the atmosphere of the performance". Park Dong-sun from The Electronic Times described Red Velvet's concert as "somewhat disappointing" but called it as a "great concert with a high level of communication to fans".

Set lists 

This setlist was performed at the August 20 concert held at the Olympic Hall in Seoul. It does not represent all shows throughout the tour.

{{hidden
| headercss = background: #ccccff; font-size: 100%; width: 75%;
| contentcss = text-align: left; font-size: 100%; width: 75%;
| header = Set list in Seoul
| content = Main Set

 "Red Dress"
 "Happily Ever After"
 "Rookie"
 "Huff n Puff"
 "Lady's Room"
 "Talk To Me"
 "Don't U Wait No More"
 "Oh Boy"
 "Dumb Dumb"
 "Baby Shark" (Pinkfong cover)
 "Hear The Sea"
 "Campfire"
 "Zoo"
 "Little Little"
 "Last Love" (Wendy's solo)
 "Be Natural" (S.E.S. cover)
 "Cool Hot Sweet Love"
 "Automatic"
 "One of These Nights"
 "Ice Cream Cake"
 "Russian Roulette" (Remix)
 "You Better Know" (Remix)
 "Red Flavor" (Extended ver.)
Encore
"Cool World"
 "Happiness"
 "Candy"
}}

This setlist does not represent all shows throughout the tour.
{{hidden
| headercss = background: #ccccff; font-size: 100%; width: 75%;
| contentcss = text-align: left; font-size: 100%; width: 75%;
| header = Set list in Japan
| content = Main Set

 "Red Dress"
 "Happily Ever After"
 "Rookie"
 "Huff n Puff"
 "Lady's Room"
 "Talk To Me"
 "Don't U Wait No More"
 "Oh Boy"
 "Dumb Dumb" (Japanese version)
 "Baby Shark" (Pinkfong cover)
 "Hear The Sea"
 "Campfire"
 "Zoo"
 "Little Little"
 "Last Love" (Wendy's solo)
 "Be Natural" (S.E.S. cover)
 "Cool Hot Sweet Love"
 "Automatic"
 "#Cookie Jar"
 "Russian Roulette" (Japanese version)
 "You Better Know" (Remix)
 "Red Flavor" (Japanese version)
Encore
 "Peek-a-Boo"
 "'Cause It's You"
}}

Tour dates

Television broadcast

Personnel 
Adapted from Red Room Kihno Video

Performer
 Red Velvet - Irene, Seulgi, Wendy, Joy, Yeri

Tour staff

 Kim Sung-hak – executive supervisor
 Lee Yeo-kyung – planning, management
 Lee Seung-chun – planning, management
 Kwon Hye-ji – contents advisor
 Ahn Eun-ok – management
 Kim Kyung-sun – management
 Lee Bo-seul – management
 Do Hyun-chang – management
 Kim Ji-yeon – management
 Park Diana – management
 Ma Kyung-bin – ticket and accounting
 Ahn Hyun-joo – ticket and accounting
 Noh Yoon-ji – ticket and accounting
 Lee Young-ah – ticket and accounting
 Wi Jung-soo – ticket and accounting

Stage creative staff

 Kim Sung-hak – executive supervisor
 Lee Yeo-kyung – planning, management
 Lee Seung-chun – planning, management
 Kwon Hye-ji – contents advisor
 Ahn Eun-ok – management
 Kim Kyung-sun – management
 Lee Bo-seul – management
 Do Hyun-chang – management
 Kim Ji-yeon – management
 Park Diana – management
 Ma Kyung-bin – ticket and accounting
 Ahn Hyun-joo – ticket and accounting
 Noh Yoon-ji – ticket and accounting
 Lee Young-ah – ticket and accounting
 Wi Jung-soo – ticket and accounting
 Lee Yeon-geun – production manager
 Tak Young-joon – choreography direction
 Hong Sung-yong – choreography direction
 Jae Shim – choreography direction, choreographer
 Hwang Mi-ri – dancer
 Yoo Seul-gi – dancer
 Kim Hyun-i – dancer
 Jeong Sun-min – dancer
 Ryu So-hee – choreographer
 Choi Young-joon – choreographer
 Bae Hyo-jung – choreographer
 Jin Hyun-ho – choreographer
 Ahn Sang-jin – choreographer
 Lee Da-bin – choreographer
 Lee Joon-woo – choreographer
 Choi Won-jun – choreographer
 Park Sung-ryeong – choreographer
 Eum Bi-ryang – stage director and designer
 Cho Hyun-hak – stage director and designer
 Seo Jung-min – stage director and designer
 Jung Kyung-ho – stage
 Kim Bong-ryong – stage
 Yoon Tae-hyun – stage
 Ahn Ki-hyun – stage set
 Park Byung-yoon – stage set
 Yoon Joo-il – stage construction
 Yeo In-wan – stage construction
 Lee Ji-hong – manipulator
 Seo Eun-kyung – live sound engineering
 Cho Seung-je – live sound engineering
 Bae Sang-heon – live sound engineering
 Lee Jang-kyun – live sound engineering
 Kim Min-ji – live sound engineering
 Kim Myung-soo – lighting
 Jung Yu-seok – lighting
 Lim Young-eun – lighting
 Kim Ki-jung – neon
 Kim Ying-jae – neon
 Oh Seung-min – neon
 Ji Eun-seok – layher
 Kim In-joong – layher
 Shin Won-kyun – layher

References 

2018 concert tours
Concert tours of South Korea